The Battle of Ulan Butung was fought on 3 September 1690 between the forces of the Qing dynasty and those of the Dzungar Khanate. When attacked by the superior Qing army, the Dzungars formed a camel wall to defend their camp and defeated Qing assaults on their right flank, but were driven back on the left. They were able to withdraw into the wooded hills behind their camp in good order. The Qing commander, Fuquan, reported it as a victory, but was discredited by political opponents.

Background
The Dzungar Khanate was ruled by the Oirats, who had a longtime rivalry with the Khalkha Mongols, who by the later 17th century became the remnants of the Northern Yuan dynasty. After the death of Galdan Boshugtu Khan's brother at the hands of the Northern Yuan dynasty, he attacked them, decisively defeated them, and occupied the Mongolian Plateau. The remnants of the Northern Yuan dynasty submitted to the Qing dynasty in the hope of being restored as a client state. Motivated by the opportunity to gain control over the Mongolian Plateau and by the threat posed to them by a strong, unified Mongol state such as the Oirats threatened to form, the Qing sent their army north to subdue the Dzungars.

Battle
The Qing, running low on supplies due to the complications of operating in the difficult, dry terrain of Inner Mongolia, wanted to end the war with a decisive battle as soon as possible. Their army caught up to the Dzungars at Ulan Butung, trapping them against a range of wooded hills. The Qing started the battle with an artillery bombardment, causing light casualties among the Dzungars. The Qing launched an attack on the Dzungar left flank, driving this part of the army into the hills, where it fled. To ward off attacks on the center, the Dzungars constructed a camel wall, or tuo cheng, by lining up 10,000 camels which they used for pack animals, roping their legs together, and firing between them. Intimidated by this, the Qing attack slid off to the right, only for their cavalry and artillery to become bogged down in wet ground. The Dzungars now disassembled their camel wall and withdrew into the hills unharassed.

Aftermath
The Dzungars escaped intact, inflicting more casualties than they had suffered, enabling them to fight the Qing successfully several more times. The Qing commander, Fuquan, claimed a victory, but he had failed to destroy the Dzungar army and the Khanate remained in control of Mongolia. He was discredited by political opponents and forced into retirement.

References

Ulan Butung
Ulan Butung
1690 in China
1690 in military history
Ulan Butung